Baptiste Lafleuriel (born July 2, 1981 in Moulins) is a former French professional footballer.

Career
Lafleuriel played on the professional level in Ligue 1 and Ligue 2 for AS Saint-Étienne.

Notes

1981 births
Living people
French footballers
Ligue 1 players
Ligue 2 players
AS Saint-Étienne players
Andrézieux-Bouthéon FC players
FC Aurillac Arpajon Cantal Auvergne players
Association football midfielders
Sportspeople from Moulins, Allier
Footballers from Auvergne-Rhône-Alpes